Jovan Trifunovski (Vrutok, 23 September 1914 — Belgrade, 1 February 1997) was a Serbian geographer and anthropologist.

Biography 
Trifunovski was born in 1914. in the village of Vrutok near Gostivar in a peasant family. He finished primary school in his native village and then highschool in Skopje and Tetovo. He enrolled the Faculty of Philosophy in Skopje in 1935 where he graduated cum laude in 1939. He next went to serve in the army, during which time he worked in the Military Geographical Institute in Belgrade. He left the army with a rank of a lieutenant. From November 1940 to March 1941 he worked as an assistant professor at the Institute for Geography of the Philosophical Faculty in Skopje. 

Trifunovski participated in the April War. From 1941 to 1945 he was an assistant professor at Belgrade Institute for Geography.

In 1946 he was transferred back to the Philosophical Faculty in Skopje. He got his PhD in 1950 and two years later he became a university lecturer. He worked as a professor in Belgrade and Skopje. Trifunovski spent his life working on anthropogeographical studies. He published a number of books and articles on the subject in the most eminent Yugoslav scientific publications such as the Srpski etnografski zbornik, Glasnik SANU etc.

He often publicly proclaimed that he is a Serb and in the same time criticized the pressure on Serbs in Macedonia to change their ethnic substance. He summed up his views in his 1997 book Macedonisation of South Serbia. He died in 1997. in Belgrade.

Select bibliography 
 Kumanovsko-preševska Crna Gora, Belgrade 1952. 
 Kumanovska oblast, Skopje 1974. 
 Seoska naselja Skopske kotline, Skopje 1974.

References

External links 
 Ј. Трифуноски: Москопоље - уништена хришћанска варош у Албанији
 https://docs.google.com/file/d/0B3ma9plMXxAEWV92a0Y5RURwMms/edit Кумановско-прешевска Црна Гора - Докторска дисертација

1914 births
1997 deaths
Serbian geographers
Serbian anthropologists
Yugoslav educators
Yugoslav geographers
Serbs of North Macedonia
People from Gostivar Municipality
Macedonian geographers
20th-century anthropologists
20th-century geographers